The Ven. David Evans was Archdeacon of St Asaph from 1897 to 1910.

He was born in Llanrhystud and educated in Ystrad Meurig. He was Rector of Bala then Rural Dean of Abergele, before his appointment as Archdeacon of St Asaph. He married Anne Walton, the daughter of James Walton.

Evans died in post on 1 March 1910; and his funeral was held three days later at St Asaph Cathedral.

Notes

People from Ceredigion
19th-century Welsh Anglican priests
Archdeacons of St Asaph
1910 deaths
Year of birth missing